Emiliano José Ortega Riquelme (born 7 April 1937) is a Chilean politician who served as minister of State under Eduardo Frei Ruíz-Tagle's government (1994–2000).

He has developed the most part of his political career in the agricultural area.

References

External links
 Profile at Annales de la República

1937 births
Living people
Chilean people
University of Chile alumni
University of Montpellier alumni
Christian Democratic Party (Chile) politicians